The 20th Anniversary Tour (originally known as the Neighborhoods Tour) is the eleventh headlining concert tour by American rock band, blink-182. It began on August 16, 2011, in Montreal, Quebec and finished on October 11, 2014, in Las Vegas, Nevada. The tour supported the band's sixth studio album, Neighborhoods (2011). Originally planned to begin in Europe, the tour was postponed so the band could focus on finishing their album. The tour visited Canada in 2011, the United States and Europe in 2012, Australia in 2013, and Europe again in 2014. The 20th Anniversary Tour was the last tour with Tom DeLonge, who left the band for the second time in 2015, until his return in 2022.

Background
The tour was first announced in November 2010, shortly after the band performed at various music festivals in Germany, France and England. Initial dates revealed arena shows in Manchester, Newcastle upon Tyne. Nottingham, Birmingham and London. The tour would mark the band's first arena shows in seven years. Additional dates for the tour were announced in December 2010, with festival appearances scheduled for T in the Park and Oxegen. Four Year Strong were announced to open show in the United Kingdom. While promoting his talk show, Hoppus on Music, Mark Hoppus announced the band will tour the United States along with Europe.

In April 2011, the band postponed their European tour until 2012. Tom DeLonge stated the band's forthcoming album was not complete and they wanted to provide new songs on the tour, not repeating their previous tour. A detailed explanation followed on the band's official website. It says:"It is with heavy hearts that we have to announce our planned 2011 European Summer tour has been rescheduled. When we booked the tour last year, we were confident that we would have the new album out before the Summer. Turns out we were mistaken as the album is taking longer than we thought and won't be out till later this year. We hoped we would have some new songs to play rather than do another 'greatest hits tour' which you all saw last Summer. As much as we know our fans would be cool with that, we feel that we owe you guys something new when you spend your money to come see us. Frankly, it's what needs to continue for us to remain vital. The three of us are working very hard to do what we set out to do when we re-formed...get a new blink-182 album recorded. Apologies to all of our fans who have bought tickets and were looking forward to the Summer shows but we'll be back soon with the rescheduled dates in Summer 2012, have a new album out and be able to play new songs for you all. Thanks for all of the continued support and understanding".

Shortly after this announcement, media outlets confirmed the band would tour the U.S. on the 10th Annual Honda Civic Tour. The band opened the long running concert tour back in 2001. They were joined by My Chemical Romance. With the album near completion in June 2011, the band toured Canada in August, separate from the Honda Civic Tour.

Opening acts
Against Me! (Canada)
Rancid (Canada)
The All-American Rejects (Europe, select dates)
Four Year Strong (Birmingham—7 June, London—8 June, Dublin, Belfast)
Twin Atlantic (London—9 June, Manchester, Birmingham—16 June, Sheffield, Newcastle, Glasgow)
The Blackout (Bournemouth, Cardiff, Nottingham, Liverpool)
Royal Republic (Germany)
Lower Than Atlantis (London;25 July)

Setlist
"Feeling This"
"Up All Night"
"The Rock Show"
"What's My Age Again?"
"Down"
"I Miss You"
"Stay Together for the Kids"
"Dumpweed"
"Not Now"
"Always"
"Violence"
"After Midnight"
"First Date"
"Heart's All Gone"
"Dick Lips"
"Man Overboard"
"Ghost on the Dancefloor"
"All the Small Things"
"Josie"
Encore
"Untitled I" (contains elements of "Can a Drummer Get Some?", "Beat Goes On", "Let's Go" and "Misfits") (Instrumental Interlude)
"Carousel"
"Dammit"
"Family Reunion"
Source:

Tour dates

Festivals and other miscellaneous performances

Cancellations and rescheduled shows

Critical reception
The shows in Canada were well received by music critics. Rob Williams (Winnipeg Free Press) gave the concert at the MTS Centre four out of five stars. He says, "It didn't seem to matter to the crowd of 6,000 who ate everything up, from old favourites like 'Feeling This', 'Rock Show' and 'What's My Age Again?' to the new 'Up All Night' and 'After Midnight', both which lack the melodic hooks of their best material". For their show at Rexall Place, Mike Ross (Jam!) gave the band four out of five stars. .

The band's Music Hall of Williamsburg 9/11 benefit show received critical acclaim. "On Wednesday night, Blink tore through the tiny Brooklyn club, raging hard and bringing some much needed relief to a city still dealing with the terrorist attacks of a dozen years ago", wrote James Montgomery of MTV News. "There were no somber moments, just Blink's patented brand of hard-bopping pop punk (and the occasional masturbation joke). And based on how the crowd's reaction, it was just what this city needed." Patrick Flanary of Rolling Stone called it "easily Blink's smallest gig in ages", writing that "Music Hall of Williamsburg made for a wall-to-wall pit of fans hell-bent on slamming beers and slam-dancing. Even stage security joined in the fun; one bouncer, while corralling crowd-surfers, sang along to "I Miss You."" Mischa Pearlman of The Hollywood Reporter wrote that "They still know how to entertain and have fun, mixing the ri-dick-ulous with the emotional [...] [they] did both themselves and the charities they’re raising money for more than proud." Chris Payne of Billboard wrote that "The Music Hall of Williamsburg is usually reserved for buzz bands, established indie acts, and nostalgia tours, but Blink-182 was never one to play by the typical rock rules -- last night they nearly tore the place down with a intimate, frenzied performance for a tightly packed room of diehard fans." The Village Voice Maria Sherman called the performance "better than anything", noting that "For Blink, with age comes consistency, and they showcased it by playing the set list they've played all tour, which mostly consists of the hits. It's consistent, but never complacent: this is the difference between the good and the great. Guess which camp Blink belong to?"

External links

References

2011 concert tours
2012 concert tours
2013 concert tours
2014 concert tours
Blink-182 concert tours